"My Heart Can't Take It No More" is a 1963 song recorded by The Supremes for the Motown label. Written and produced by Clarence Paul, "My Heart Can't Take It No More" charted at 29 on the Billboard Bubbling Under Hot 100 Singles chart. The group would not miss charting a single again on the Billboard Hot 100 chart for another 12 years.

Cash Box described it as "a tearful, beat-ballad hip-swinger...that the femmes carve out with loads of feeling."

Personnel
 Lead vocals by Diana Ross
 Background vocals by Diana Ross, Florence Ballard and Mary Wilson
 All instruments by The Funk Brothers

Chart history

References

1962 songs
1963 singles
The Supremes songs
Songs written by Clarence Paul
Motown singles